Andrews is a patronymic surname of English, Scottish, and Norse origin. At the time of the 1881 British Census, its relative frequency was highest in Dorset (3.6 times the British average), followed by Wiltshire, Huntingdonshire, Worcestershire, Hampshire, Suffolk, Cambridgeshire, Devon and Somerset.

The surname Andrews was first found in Caithness, North Scotland. Historically, the Andrews clan were closely associated with Clan Ross. The Andrews of Scotland dispersed during the 17th, 18th, and 19th centuries and are now found worldwide in America, Canada, and Australia. Many Andrews also moved to Northern Ireland and England.

A
 A. W. Andrews (1868–1959), British pioneer rock-climber
 Abraham D. Andrews (1830–1885), American politician
 Al Andrews (born 1945), US American footballer
 Albert Andrews (1881–1960), Canadian politician
 Albert LeRoy Andrews (1878–1961), American professor of Germanic philology and avocational bryologist
 Allan Andrews (disambiguation), several people
 Andy Andrews (tennis) (born 1959), American tennis player
 Andy Andrews (born 1959), American author
 Annie Dale Biddle Andrews, American who was the first woman to earn a Ph.D. in mathematics from Berkeley
 Anthony Andrews (born 1948), British actor  (Under the Volcano)
 Archie Andrews (comics), fictional character from the Archie Comics
 Archie Andrews (puppet), character of British ventriloquist Peter Brough
 Arlan Andrews, American mechanical engineer and writer
 Arthur Andrews (disambiguation), several people

B
 Barbara Andrews, American novelist
 Barry Andrews (disambiguation), several people
 Ben Andrews (actor) (1942–1981), American television actor
 Ben Andrews (mathematician), Australian mathematician
 Bill Andrews (disambiguation), several people
 Billy Andrews (footballer) (1886-?), Irish footballer
 Billy Andrews (born 1945), US American footballer
 Blake Andrews (born 1968), American photographer
 Bob Andrews (keyboardist) (born 1949), English keyboardist with Brinsley Schwarz
 Bob Andrews (guitarist) (born 1959), English musician with Generation X
 Brian Andrews (actor), American actor
 Brian Andrews (doctor) (born 1955), Canadian-American neurosurgeon
 Brittany Andrews (born 1973), American porn actress
 Bruce Andrews (born 1948), American poet
 Bryan Andrews (cricketer) (born 1945), New Zealand cricketer
 Bryan Andrews (storyboard artist), American storyboard artist and writer
 Bunny Andrews, US American footballer

C
 Carl Andrews, American politician
 Charles Andrews (disambiguation), several people
 Chris Andrews (disambiguation), several people
 Christopher Columbus Andrews (1829–1922), American brigadier general
 Clayton Andrews (baseball, born 1997), American professional baseball player
 Clifford Andrews (1912–1973), English cricketer
 T. Coleman Andrews (1899–1983), American presidential candidate

D
 Daisy Andrews (c. 1934 or 1935–2015), Australian painter
 Damon Andrews (born 1971), New Zealand actor and director
 Dana Andrews (1909–1992), American actor and President of the Screen Actors Guild
 Daniel Andrews (born 1972), Australian politician
 Danny Andrews, American Paralympic athlete
 Darren Andrews (born 1995), American football player
 David Andrews (disambiguation), several people
 Dean Andrews (born 1963), British actor
 Del Andrews (1894–1942), American director and screenwriter (The Racket, All Quiet on the Western Front)
 Denise Andrews (born 1959), American politician
 Deno Andrews (born 1971), American billiards player
 Don Andrews (born 1942 as Vilim Zlomislić), Canadian white-supremacist
 Donald Andrews (born 1955), Canadian economist
 Donna Andrews (golfer) (born 1967), American golfer
 Donna Andrews (writer), American writer
 Duane Andrews (born 1972), Canadian guitarist and composer
 Dylan Andrews (born 1979), New Zealand mixed martial artist

E
 Eamonn Andrews (1922–1987), Irish television presenter
 Ed Andrews (1859–1934), American baseball player
 Eddie Andrews (born 1977), South African rugby union footballer
 Edgar Andrews (born 1932), English physicist and engineer
 Edith Alice Andrews (1873–1958), British artist
 Edith Lovell Andrews (1886–1980), British artist
 Edmund L. Andrews, American journalist and writer, The New York Times economics reporter
 Edmund Andrews (surgeon) (1824–1904), American surgeon
 Edward Andrews (1914–1985), American actor
 Edward Gayer Andrews (1825–1907), Bishop of the Methodist Episcopal Church
 Elisha Benjamin Andrews (1844–1917), American economist
 Elizabeth Andrews (1882–1960), Labour Party organiser in Wales
 Elizabeth B. Andrews (1911–2002), U.S. congresswoman from Alabama
 Eric Andrews (1933–2001), Australian historian
 Erica Andrews (1969–2013), stage name of Erica Salazar, Mexican-American performer
 Erin Andrews (born 1978), American sportscaster
 Ernie Andrews (1927-2022), American jazz, blues, and pop singer
 Esao Andrews (born 1978), American painter

F
 Finn Andrews (born 1983), English musician
 Florence Andrews (1912–1996), New Zealand fencer
 Francis Andrews (1718–1774), Irish politician
 Frank Andrews (disambiguation), several people
 Fred Andrews (disambiguation), several people

G
 Gareth Andrews (born 1946), Australian rules footballer from Victoria
 Garry Andrews (born 1957), Australian artist
 George Andrews (disambiguation), several people
 Georgina Andrews, Australian actress
 Gerald Smedley Andrews (1903–2005), Canadian surveyor
 Geraldine Andrews (born 1959), judge of the High Court of England and Wales
 Giuseppe Andrews (born 1975), American actor and director

H
 Harold Andrews (footballer, born 1897) (1897–1984), English football forward in the 1920s
 Harold Andrews (footballer, born 1903) (1903–1988), English football forward
 Harold Marcus Ervine-Andrews (1911–1995), Irish soldier
 Harris Andrews (born 1996), Australian rules footballer
 Harry Andrews (1911–1989), British actor (The Ruling Class)
 Harvey Andrews (born 1943), British folk musician
 Helena Andrews (born 1980), American author, journalist and critic
 Henry Andrews (mathematician) (1744–1820), British mathematician and astronomer
 Henry Andrews (cricketer) (1821–1865), English cricketer
 Henry Cranke Andrews (fl. 1794–1830), English botanist, botanical artist and engraver
 Henry John Andrews (1871–1919), British Army officer
 Herbert Kennedy Andrews (1904–1965), British composer and organist
 Hub Andrews (1922–2012), American baseball player

I
 Ian Andrews (born 1964), English footballer
 Ike Franklin Andrews (1925–2010), American politician
 Inez Andrews (1929–2012), American gospel singer
 Irene Osgood Andrews (1879–?), American writer

J
 Jack Andrews (1898–1974), English footballer
 Jack Andrews (1903–1986), Northern Ireland politician, son of J. M. Andrews
 Jake Andrews (disambiguation), several people
 James Andrews (botanical artist) (1801–1876), English botanical artist
 Sir James Andrews, 1st Baronet (1877–1951), member of Privy Council of Northern Ireland
 James Andrews (physician) (born 1942), American orthopedic surgeon
 James J. Andrews (1829–1862), Unionist spy during the American Civil War
 James J. Andrews (mathematician) (1930–1998), American mathematician
 James Pettit Andrews (c. 1737–1797), English historian
 Jane Andrews (author) (1833–1887), American author of children's books
 Jane Andrews (born 1967), English former Royal dresser and convicted murderer of Tom Cressman
 Jane Mancini, fictional character from Melrose Place
 Jessica Andrews (born 1983), American country singer
 Jessie Andrews (born 1992), American porn actress
 Jim Andrews (1865–1907), American baseball player
 Jimmy Andrews (1927–2012), Scottish footballer
 Jim Wynorski, goes by Jay Andrews, American film director 
 Joely Andrews (born 2002), Northern Irish footballer
 John Andrews (disambiguation), several people
 John Bertram Andrews (1880–1943), American economist
 J. M. Andrews (1871–1956), Northern Ireland politician, 2nd Prime Minister of Northern Ireland
 John Nevins Andrews (1829–1883), American Seventh-day Adventist Church missionary
 Joseph Andrews (disambiguation), several people
 Josh Andrews (born 1991), American football player
 Judith Walker Andrews (1826–1914), American philanthropist and social reformer
 Julie Andrews (born 1935), British actress

K
 Kaare Andrews, Canadian comic book artist and filmmaker
 Karen Andrews (born 1960), Australian politician 
 Kay Andrews, Baroness Andrews (born 1943), British Labour politician
 Keith Andrews (disambiguation), several people
 Kelly Andrews (disambiguation), several people
 Ken Andrews (born 1967), American musician
 Kenneth R. Andrews (1916–2005), American academic and a 'father' of Corporate Strategy
 Kenneth Andrews (sociologist), American sociologist
 Kevin Andrews (disambiguation), several people

L
 LaVerne Andrews (1911–1967), American singer with the Andrews Sisters
 Lee Andrews (born 1984), English footballer
 Lee Andrews & the Hearts lead singer Lee Andrews (1936–2016), American singer
 LeRoy Andrews (1898-?), US American football player and coach
 Lilian Andrews, (1878–c.1962), English artist
 Linda Andrews (singer) (born 1973), Faroese singer 
 Lloyd Andrews (1894–1974), Canadian ice-hockey player
 Lloyd J. Andrews (1920–2014), American politician and businessman
 Lois Andrews (1924–1968), American actress
 Lori Andrews, American law professor

M
 Mahala Andrews (1939–1997), British vertebrae palaeontologist
 Maidie Andrews (1893-1986), British actress
 Major Andre Andrews (1792–1834), American politician
 Malcolm Andrews (1944–2018), Australian author and journalist
 Marie Louise Andrews (1849-1891), American writer
 Mark Andrews (disambiguation), several people
 Marvin Andrews (born 1975), footballer from Trinidad and Tobago
 Mary Andrews (disambiguation), several people
 Maxene Andrews (1916–1995), American singer with the Andrews Sisters
 Michael Andrews (disambiguation), several people
 Michelle Andrews (born 1971), Australian field hockey midfielder

N
 Nate Andrews (1913–1991), American baseball pitcher
 Naveen Andrews (born 1969), British actor
 Niall Andrews (1937–2006), Irish politician
 Nigel Andrews, British journalist
 Noel Andrews (1932–2011), Irish radio and television commentator and disc jockey
 Norman Andrews (1899–1971), English cricketer

O
 Olive Andrews (1818-?), twenty-third wife of Brigham Young
 Orianna Andrews (1834–1883), American medical doctor
 Oscar Andrews (1876–1956), Irish cricketer and field hockey player

P
 Pamela Andrews, fictional character from Pamela, or Virtue Rewarded
 Patty Andrews (1918–2013), American singer with the Andrews Sisters
 Paul Andrews (disambiguation), several people
 Peter Andrews (disambiguation), several people
 Phil Andrews (disambiguation), several people

Q
Quinton Andrews (born 1987), US American football player

R
 Richard Andrews (disambiguation), several people
 Ricky Andrews (born 1966), Samoan who played American and Canadian football
 Robert Andrews (disambiguation), several people
 Romel Andrews (born 1963), American player of gridiron football
 Ron Andrews (born 1955), Australian rules footballer from Victoria
 Roy Chapman Andrews (1884–1960), American explorer, adventurer and naturalist

S
 Samuel Andrews (disambiguation), several people
 Sarah Andrews (author), American geologist and author
 Sarah Andrews (cricketer) (born 1981), Australian cricketer
 Sasha Andrews (born 1983), Canadian football (soccer) defender
 Shane Andrews (born 1971), American baseball player
 Shawn Andrews (born 1982), US American football player
 Simon Andrews (disambiguation), several people
 Solomon Andrews (inventor) (1806–1872), U.S. politician and inventor of a dirigible aircraft
 Solomon Andrews (business man) (1835–1908), English entrepreneur in Wales
 Stephen Andrews, Canadian Anglican bishop
 Stephen Andrews (artist) (born 1956), Canadian artist
 Stephen Pearl Andrews (1812–1886), American anarchist
 Steve Andrews aka "The Bard of Ely" (born 1953), Welsh singer-songwriter, writer and journalist
 Susan Andrews (born 1971), Australian (Tasmanian) athlete
 Sybil Andrews (1898–1992), English artist
 Sydnee Andrews (born 2002), New Zealand judoka
 Sydney Andrews, fictional character from Melrose Place

T
 Tara Andrews (born 1994), Australian (soccer) footballer
 Ted Andrews (1952–2009), American author
 Theresa Andrews (born 1962), American backstroke swimmer
 Thomas Andrews (1873–1912), British businessman and shipbuilder, architect of RMS Titanic
 Thomas Andrews (disambiguation), several people
 Todd Andrews (1901–1985), Irish Republican political activist, Fianna Fáil founder
 Tommie Lee Andrews, American, first person to be convicted as a result of DNA evidence
 Tracie Andrews (born 1969), Englishwomen convicted of murdering her fiancé
 Tyson Andrews (born 1990), Australian Rugby League player

V
 V. C. Andrews (1923–1986), American novelist

W
 Wally Andrews (1859–1940), American baseball catcher
 Wayne Andrews (disambiguation), several people
 William Andrews (disambiguation), several people

Y
 Yvette Borup Andrews (1891-1959), American photographer

See also
 Andrews (disambiguation)
 Andrew (surname)
 S. W. Erdnase Some card magic historians theorize this may be a pseudonym for an anonymous writer named Andrews; i.e., "E. S. Andrews" spelled backward.

References

External links
Andrews Surname DNA Project

English-language surnames
Patronymic surnames
Surnames from given names